is a train station in the city of Azumino, Nagano Prefecture, Japan, operated by East Japan Railway Company (JR East).

Lines
Nakagaya Station is served by the Ōito Line and is 8.4 kilometers from the starting point of the line at Matsumoto Station.

Station layout
The station consists of one ground-level side platform serving a single bi-directional track. The station building is modelled after the Kasuke Shrine of the Jōkyō Gimin Memorial Museum. The station is a  Kan'i itaku station.

History
Nakagaya Station opened on 30 May 1915. With the privatization of Japanese National Railways (JNR) on 1 April 1987, the station came under the control of JR East. A new station building was completed in 2015.

Passenger statistics
In fiscal 2015, the station was used by an average of 395 passengers daily (boarding passengers only).

Surrounding area

Jōkyō Gimin Memorial Museum

See also
 List of railway stations in Japan

References

External links

 JR East station information 
Joukyou Gimin Memorial Museum

Railway stations in Nagano Prefecture
Ōito Line
Railway stations in Japan opened in 1915
Stations of East Japan Railway Company
Azumino, Nagano